Nala Local Municipality is an administrative area in the Lejweleputswa District of the Free State in South Africa. The name is Sesotho for "affluence or plenty". It is derived from the maize belt and economic prosperity of the area.

Main places
The 2011 census divided the municipality into the following main places:

Politics 

The municipal council consists of twenty-four members elected by mixed-member proportional representation. Twelve councillors are elected by first-past-the-post voting in twelve wards, while the remaining twelve are chosen from party lists so that the total number of party representatives is proportional to the number of votes received. In the election of 1 November 2021 the African National Congress (ANC) lost its majority, winning twelve of the twenty-four seats.

The following table shows the results of the 2021 election.

References

External links
 http://www.nala.org.za/

Local municipalities of the Lejweleputswa District Municipality